Brachmia fuscogramma is a moth in the family Gelechiidae. It was described by Anthonie Johannes Theodorus Janse in 1960. It is found in Réunion, South Africa and Zimbabwe.

References

Moths described in 1960
Brachmia
Moths of Africa